Caprin-1 is a protein that in humans is encoded by the CAPRIN1 gene. It is suggested that Caprin1 ( RNG105) is essential for the formation of long-term memory.

Clinical significance 

In 2022, loss-of-function mutations of the CAPRIN1 gene were shown to result in an autosomal-dominant disorder. Patients having the newly-discovered disorder suffer from language impairment, speech delay, intellectual disability, ADHD and autism spectrum disorder. Somatically, they have respiratory problems, limb/skeletal anomalies, developmental delay, feeding difficulties, seizures and ophthalmologic problems.

References

Further reading